Vozdvizhenka is a rural locality (a village) in Makansky Selsoviet, Khaybullinsky District, Bashkortostan, Russia. The population was 302 as of 2010. There are 3 streets.

Geography 
Vozdvizhenka is located 37 km north of Akyar (the district's administrative centre) by road. Podolsk is the nearest rural locality.

References 

Rural localities in Khaybullinsky District